Botanical gardens in Peru have collections consisting entirely of Peru native and endemic species; most have a collection that include plants from around the world. There are botanical gardens and arboreta in all states and territories of Peru, most are administered by local governments, some are privately owned.

 Jardín Etnobotánico Nugkui
 Jardín Etnobotánico Pisaq
 Trujillo Botanical Garden, Trujillo

References 

Peru
Botanical gardens